HMS Portsmouth was a fifth rate built under the 1689 programme built at Deptford Dockyard. Her guns were listed under old terms for guns as demi-culverines, sakers and minions. After commissioning she spent her short career with the Fleet in Home Waters. She was taken by the French in 1696.

Portsmouth was the sixth named vessel since it was used for a 46-gun ship.

Construction
She was ordered on 28 June 1689 from Portsmouth Dockyard to be built under the guidance of Master Shipwright William Stigant. She was launched on 13 May 1690.

Commissioned Service
She was commissioned in 1690 under the command of Captain Francis Wyvill, RN for service with the Channel Fleet. In 1891 she was under the command of Captain William Whetstone, RN followed by Captain John Bridges, RN on 17 June 1691 then in 1693 Captain Charles Britiffe, RN was her commander. In concert with HMS Deptford she took the 36-gun St malouine privateer, La Hyacinthe in November 1693. She then joined Russel's Fleet in October/November 1694. Captain Gabriel Millerson, RN took command for service with Admiral Benbow's squadron in 1696.

Loss
HMS Portsmouth was taken by four French privateers off Romney on 11 October 1696.

Notes

Citations

References
 Winfield 2009, British Warships in the Age of Sail (1603 – 1714), by Rif Winfield, published by Seaforth Publishing, England © 2009, EPUB , Chapter 5, The Fifth Rates, Vessels acquired from 16 December 1688, Fifth Rates of 32 and 36 guns, 1689 Programme, Portsmouth
 Colledge, Ships of the Royal Navy, by J.J. Colledge, revised and updated by Lt Cdr Ben Warlow and Steve Bush, published by Seaforth Publishing, Barnsley, Great Britain, © 2020, EPUB , Section P (Portsmouth)

 

Frigates of the Royal Navy
Ships built in Portsmouth
Ships of the Royal Navy
1690s ships